Chung-Ying Cheng (Chinese: 成中英, born November 8, 1935) is a distinguished scholar of Chinese philosophy and Professor in the Department of Philosophy at the University of Hawai'i at Manoa. He is considered one of the pioneers who formalized the field of Chinese philosophy in the United States in the 1960s.

Education and career
Cheng received his B.A. from National Taiwan University in 1956, his M.A. from University of Washington in 1958, and Ph.D. from Harvard University in 1963. He joined the Department of Philosophy at the University of Hawaii at Manoa in 1963. He has lectured at numerous prestigious institutions such as Yale University and Oxford University. He also served as Chair of Department of Philosophy at National Taiwan University and Director of the Graduate Institute of Philosophy at Taida. Currently, he is Visiting Chair Professor in Chinese Philosophy at King's College London, visiting professor at Peking University and Tsinghua University, Distinguished Chair Professor at Renmin University, and Visiting Chair Professor of Humanities at Shanghai Jiaotong University.

Cheng's research interests are in the areas of Chinese logic, the I Ching and the origins of Chinese philosophy, Confucian and Neo-Confucian Philosophy, the onto-hermeneutics of Eastern and Western philosophy, and Chan (Zen) philosophy. Recently, he has specifically worked on the philosophy of c-management and Confucian Bio-Ethics as they relate to the Chinese tradition, and on how Chinese culture relates to world culture. He founded the Journal of Chinese Philosophy published by Blackwell Publishers in 1973 and has served as editor-in-chief since then.

Books
 Cheng, Chung-Ying. (1991). New dimensions of Confucian and neo-Confucian philosophy. Albany, NY: State University of New York Press.
 Cheng, Chung-Ying. (2020). The primary way: Philosophy of Yijing. Albany, NY: State University of New York Press.
 Cheng, Chung-Ying. (1991). Shiji zhi jiao de jueze: Lun Zhong-Xi zhexue zhong de huitong yuronghe [Choice at the turn of a new century: On the interflux and integration of Chinese and Western philosophy]. Shanghai, China: Zhishi Chubanshe.
 Cheng, Chung-Ying. (1991). Wenhua, lilun yu guanli: Zhongguo xiandaihua de zhexue xingsi [Culture, ethics, and the philosophy of management]. Guiyang: Guizhou Renmin Chubanshe.
 Cheng, Chung-Ying. (1995). C lilun: Yijing guanli zhexue [C Theory: The Yijing philosophy of management]. Taipei, Taiwan: Dongda Tushu Chubanshe.
 Cheng, Chung-Ying. (1999). C Theory: Chinese philosophy of management (in Chinese). Shanghai, China: Xueling Publishers.
 Cheng, Chung-Ying. (2000). Ontology and interpretation (in Chinese). Beijing, China: Sanlian Publishers.
 Cheng, Chung-Ying. (2001). A treatise on Confucian philosophy: The way of uniting the outer and the inner (in Chinese). Beijing, China: China Social Sciences Publishers.

Edited books
 Cheng, Chung-Ying, & Bunnin, Nicholas (Eds.). (2002). Contemporary Chinese philosophy. Malden, MA: Blackwell.
 Cheng, Chung-Ying, & Zhou, Hanguang. (1997). Light of wisdom: The contemporary application of Chinese management philosophy. Shanghai, China: Chinese Textile University Press.
 Hsiung, James C., & Cheng, Chung-Ying (Eds.). (1991). Distribution of power and rewards: Proceedings of the International Conference on Democracy and Social Justice East and West, 1988. Lanham, MD: University Press of America.  
 Krijnen, Christian, & Cheng, Chung-Ying Cheng (Eds.). (2021). Philosophical methodology in classical Chinese and German philosophy. Nordhausen, Germany: Traugott Bautz.

Journal articles and book chapters
 Cheng, Chung-Ying. (1986). Chinese philosophy in America, 1965-1985: Retrospect and prospect. Journal of Chinese Philosophy, 13(2), 155-165.
 Cheng, Chung-Ying. (1986). On the environmental ethics of the Tao and the Ch’i. Environmental Ethics, 8(4), 351–370.
 Cheng, Chung-Ying. (1986). The concept of face and its Confucian roots. Journal of Chinese Philosophy, 13(3), 329–348.
 Cheng, Chung-Ying. (1987). Logic and language in Chinese philosophy. Journal of Chinese Philosophy, 14(3), 285-307.
 Cheng, Chung-Ying. (1998). Transforming Confucian virtues into human rights. In Wm Theodore de Bary & Tu Weiming (Eds.), Confucianism and human rights (pp. 142-153). New York, NY: Columbia University Press.
 Cheng, Chung-Ying. (2008). The Yijing as creative inception of Chinese philosophy. Journal of Chinese Philosophy, 35(2), 201–218.
 Cheng, Chung-Ying. (2021). Creative ontology of interpretation: How to understand identity, difference, and harmony in Chinese Philosophy. In Christian Krijnen & Chung-Ying Cheng (Eds.), Philosophical methodology in classical Chinese and German philosophy (pp. 169-188). Nordhausen, Germany: Traugott Bautz.
 Cheng, Chung-Ying. (2022). Chinese principles of human communication: A philosophical outline. In Yoshitaka Miike & Jing Yin (Eds.), The handbook of global interventions in communication theory (pp. 253-265). New York, NY: Routledge.

References

University of Hawaiʻi faculty
Harvard University alumni
University of Washington alumni
Living people
Taiwanese emigrants to the United States
Taiwanese philosophers
Republic of China philosophers
Chinese Confucianists
New Confucian philosophers
Writers from Nanjing
Philosophers from Jiangsu
Republic of China essayists
Taiwanese writers
Educators from Nanjing
Taiwanese people from Jiangsu
1935 births